Zoonipora is a medium size village in the locality of Dooniwari, located in BAGAT KANIPORA ( B.K.POORA ) Tehsil of Budgam district, Jammu and Kashmir with total 57 families residing. The Zooni Pora village has population of 471 of which 237 are males while 234 are females as per Population Census 2011.

Demographics 
In Zoonipora village population of children with age 0-6 is 82 which makes up 17.41 % of total population of village. Average Sex Ratio of Zoonipora village is 987 which is higher than Jammu and Kashmir state average of 889. Child Sex Ratio for the Zooni Pora as per census is 1216, higher than Jammu and Kashmir average of 862.

Education 
Zoonipora village has lower literacy rate compared to Jammu and Kashmir. In 2011, literacy rate of Zooni Pora village was 60.41 % compared to 67.16 % of Jammu and Kashmir. In Zoonipora Male literacy stands at 70.00 % while female literacy rate was 50.26 %.

See also 
 Dooniwari
 Srinagar
 Bagati Kani Pora

References

Budgam district